Herman Frederik Nijhout (born November 25, 1947) is a Dutch-born American evolutionary biologist and the John Franklin Crowell Professor of Biology at Duke University. His research is focused on evolutionary developmental biology and entomology, with a particular focus on the hormonal control of growth, molting and metamorphosis in insects, including the mechanisms that control the development of alternative phenotypes. Much of his work has also been concerned with understanding the development and evolution of the wing patterns of  butterflies.  He received the ESA Founders' Memorial Award from the Entomological Society of America in 2006. In 2015, he was awarded the A.O. Kowalevsky Medal, and in 2018, he was elected a fellow of the American Academy of Arts and Sciences.

References

External links
Faculty page
Lab page
Interview with WUNC

Living people
Dutch biologists
Dutch emigrants to the United States
Evolutionary biologists
Developmental biologists
Dutch entomologists
Duke University faculty
Fellows of the American Academy of Arts and Sciences
1947 births
University of Notre Dame alumni
Harvard University alumni